Hélène Monastier (2 December 1882 – 7 March 1976) was a Swiss peace activist and teacher in Lausanne.

Life 
Hélène-Sophie Monastier was born in Payerne. Daughter of Charles Louis, Protestant pastor and librarian, and Marie Louise Gonin. She had a brother, Louis, who was twelve years older.

She lived her entire life with a paralyzed leg as a result of the poliomyelitis contracted at the age of two years. Her parents attitude  facilitated her childhood, but she suffered from the consequences of the disease in his adolescence. At the age of 27 she tried an operation but without obtaining noticeable improvements. However, her friend Samuel Gagnebin gifted her excerpts of Prière pour demander à Dieu le bon usage des maladies by from Blaise Pascal, and she was transformed. Since this moment she considered herself "cured".

Monastier did her studies in Payerne and Lausanne, and stays in Great Britain and Germany; where she trained as a teacher and she also discovered the living conditions of workers, unemployment, class struggle and socialism. She was a teacher of French, History and Geography for 40 years, from 1904 until 1943, at the private school École Vinet in Lausanne.

Monastier organized the first camp for grammar school girls in 1909, bringing together pupils from Lausanne, Geneva and Neuchâtel. This was the forerunner of the "Camp d’éducatrices de Vaumarcus", a center for meetings, training and vacations for Christian Unions of young people, in which she participated every year up until 1962.

In 1911, she joined the Christian Socialist movement and helped working class youth at the Maison du Peuple (‘People’s House’) in Lausanne. In 1920, she was involved in founding the Christian-Social Movement in French-speaking Switzerland.

Her first meeting with the Service Civil International (SCI) founder, Pierre Cérésole, took place in 1917 in a public meeting. where he announced his refusal to pay military taxes. They initiated a friendship and she started getting involved in his peace activism. Monastier supported the organization in its early period and helped Pierre Ceresole to network internationally. She also took part in several SCI workcamps. In Les Ormonts in the alpine area of canton Vaud, from 7 to 28 August 1924, she participated with a dozen committed male and female pacifists in the first voluntary work camp organized by Pierre Cérésole in Switzerland, offering help, supplies, accommodation and tools in the village, where a winter avalanche covered a house and its grounds with rocks, mud and tree-trunks.

Through Pierre Cérésole she got acquainted with the Quakers. She spent time at the Woodbrooke Quaker Study Centre in Birmingham and joined the Quakers in 1930. She was the first "clerk" of the Swiss branch, founded the annual meeting of Quakers in Switzerland as well as the magazine Entre Amis.

From 1946 to 1952, she was the first International President of SCI. After Cérésole’s death, she published his biography and several of his papers.

In 1955, she was involved in the founding of the foreign aid organisation Helvetas (now Helvetas Swiss Intercooperation) together with Rodolfo Olgiati and others. She died in Lausanne in 1976.

Personality 
Hélène Monastier is described as a born educator, "having the gift of bringing out of each of her students the best, through her respect for the personality of children", her love and her severity. "With the brain of a CEO, she had all the assets: great clarity of thought, rapidity of decision, innate sense of organization, good pen and a lot of humor".

Tribute 
On October 3, 2003 a commemorative plaque in her honor was placed in Lausanne (Pré-du-Marché 17).

Publications
 Hélène Monastier, Pierre Ceresole, un quaker d'aujourd'hui. Paris, 1947.
 Hélène Monastier, Edmond Privat, Lise Ceresole, Samuel Gagnebin, Pierre Ceresole d'après sa correspondance. Neuchâtel, 1960.
 Textes de Hélène Monastier et Pierre Ceresole et de Arnold Bolle, Lausanne, Alonso Diez, 1954.

References

External links

  (French)

1882 births
1976 deaths
20th-century Quakers
Female Christian socialists
Quaker socialists
Swiss anti-war activists
Swiss Christian pacifists
Swiss Quakers
Swiss women activists